Each state in the United States has a senior military officer, as the state adjutant general, who is the de facto commander of a state's military forces, including the National Guard residing within the state, the state's naval militia, and any state defense forces. This officer is known as TAG (The Adjutant General), and is subordinated to the chief executive (generally the state's governor). They do not have authority over police forces, only military forces.

Source of appointment
In 49 states, Puerto Rico, Guam, and the United States Virgin Islands, the adjutant general is appointed by the governor. The exceptions are Vermont, where the adjutant general is appointed by a vote of the Vermont General Assembly, and the District of Columbia, where a commanding general is appointed by the President of the United States of America.  Until 2016, South Carolina chose its adjutant general in statewide general elections, but after passage of a popular referendum, the holder of this position is now appointed by the governor.

Responsibilities
Each adjutant general shares a common responsibility for the state's National Guard plus a unique set of other responsibilities defined by the state's constitution, state statutes, and other state-level directives.  In addition to their state responsibilities, each TAG is responsible to the federal government for the use and care of federal assets under the state's control.  The National Guard Bureau (NGB) in the Department of Defense provides a centralized administrative, funding, and procurement process to support the states' military departments.  The Chief of the National Guard Bureau also provides input as a member of the Joint Chiefs of Staff on national military activities as they relate to the National Guard.

The 54 adjutants general collectively form the Adjutants General Association of the United States (AGAUS) which strives to enhance both state and national military security.  A professional military guard organization, the National Guard Association of the United States serves to lobby both Congress and the Executive branch about common needs of the Guard as a whole and also provide support to members of the National Guard.

National Guard
Each adjutant general commands their state's Army and Air National Guard units which are not on federal active duty.  When a National Guard unit is federalized it is moved from state command to the Department of Defense and placed under an Army or Air Force command.

State defense forces
Twenty-three adjutants general have responsibility for military land forces that comprise state level militias under the command of the various governors and generally have state support missions.  Eight of which maintain a naval militia division.  Two adjutants general, Puerto Rico and Texas, are also responsible for an air support component.

Emergency management agencies
Some adjutant generals are responsible for oversight of the state's emergency management organization.  These groups are non-military organizations but have a close working relationship with the state's National Guard and any state defense forces.  They are the state level agency that works directly with the Federal Emergency Management Agency in preparing for, responding to, and recovering from disasters.

Homeland security
Some states have assigned their adjutant general the responsibility for overseeing homeland security.  In other states, this responsibility may be assigned to the state's law enforcement agency instead.

Veteran’s affairs
Some states place their veteran's affairs organization in the state's military department under the oversight of the state adjutant general.  Other states have an independent veteran's affairs department.

List of adjutants general

Each adjutant general is the senior officer in the state's military structure.  Many hold federal rank as active duty general officers, but others may for a variety of reasons, including mandatory federal military retirement age, only hold general officer rank from their state.

See also
 List of current United States National Guard major generals

References

External links

National Guard Association of the United States

Militia of the United States
Adjutant
 

Emergency management in the United States by state
Veterans' affairs ministries